Helton is an unincorporated community in Marion County, in the U.S. state of Missouri.

History
A variant name was "Helton Station".  A post office called Helton Station was established in 1878, and remained in operation until 1880. The community was named after Judge Helton, the original owner of the town site.

References

Unincorporated communities in Marion County, Missouri
Unincorporated communities in Missouri